Charles Krug (1825–1892) was among the pioneers of winemaking in the Napa Valley, California, and was the founder of the Charles Krug Winery.

Biography
Charles Krug visited the United States from Prussia in 1847, and became a citizen in 1852. In 1851 he served as an apprentice winemaker for Agoston Haraszthy and then John Patchett before establishing his own winery.  Krug married Carolina Bale, the daughter of early Napa Valley pioneer and miller Edward Turner Bale and granddaughter of María Isidora Vallejo of the prominent Californio Vallejo family, on December 26, 1860.

Krug was inducted into the Culinary Institute of America's Vintner's Hall of Fame in 2007.

Winemaking
The dowry Bale left for her included  of land north of St. Helena, California, on which Krug planted a vineyard and founded his winery in 1861. Charles Krug introduced innovative ideas in winemaking to California. He began making wine using a cider press for pressing, carefully selected rootstocks, varietals and vineyard sites. The knowledge he gained and shared benefited the young California wine industry.

Charles Krug Winery
Following Krug's death, James Moffitt Sr. purchased the winery in 1894. In 1943, Robert Mondavi persuaded his parents, Cesare and Rosa Mondavi, to purchase the inactive winery from Moffitt for $75,000.  Robert Mondavi began his wine career there, until he founded his own winery in 1966.  The winery still exists, and is owned by Robert's younger brother Peter Mondavi's family.

References

External links
 Charles Krug Winery Website

1825 births
1892 deaths
People from the Kingdom of Prussia
American winemakers
California wine
History of Napa County, California
People from St. Helena, California
19th-century American businesspeople